Jimmy: The Tale of a Girl and Her Bear is a 1923 German silent film directed by Jaap Speyer and starring Mia Pankau, Ernst Hofmann, and Margarete Lanner.

Cast

References

Bibliography

External links

1923 films
Films of the Weimar Republic
German silent feature films
Films directed by Jaap Speyer
German black-and-white films
1920s German films